Röderbach is a river of Hesse, Germany.

The Röderbach springs near Stendorf, a district of Hünfeld. It is a right tributary of the Hasel between the two districts Kirchhasel and Großenbach of Hünfeld.

See also
List of rivers of Hesse

References

Rivers of Hesse
Rivers of Germany